P.S. is a solo album by Goran Bregović published in 1996, that is not a soundtrack, but rather a choice of his favourite compositions that appeared in several films (Bregović is widely popular for making music for films).

Track listing
"Babylon"
"Ausensija"
"Man From Reno"
"In the Death Car"
"La Nuit Sacree"
"Parfum Paranoia"
"Dreams"
"Indecent Sacrifice"
"Get the Money"
"La Nuit de la St. Barthelemy"

References

Goran Bregović albums
1996 albums
Komuna (company) compilation albums